Coe Hill is a mountain located in the Catskill Mountains of New York northeast of North Franklin. Jackson Hill is located southwest and White Hill is located southwest of Coe Hill.

References

Mountains of Delaware County, New York
Mountains of New York (state)